Adnan Alisic (born 10 February 1984) is a Dutch footballer who plays as a midfielder for RVV COAL in the Dutch Tweede Klasse.

Club career
Born in Rotterdam, Alisic made his professional debut for Utrecht on 30 November 2003, replacing Donny de Groot in the 80th minute of the Eredivisie home match against Roda JC, which Utrecht won 3-1. After failing to break into the Utrecht first-team, Alisic dropped down a division to sign for Dordrecht in 2006. After a successful season in the second tier of Dutch football, Alisic signed for Eredivisie club Excelsior in 2007, before moving to Hungarian club Debrecen in July 2011. Alisic returned to Dordrecht in summer 2012 after an unsuccessful spell in Hungary.

In summer 2015 he turned semi-pro when joining GVVV.

References

External links
 Voetbal International profile 

1984 births
Living people
Dutch people of Bosnia and Herzegovina descent
Dutch footballers
Footballers from Rotterdam
FC Dordrecht players
FC Utrecht players
Excelsior Rotterdam players
Debreceni VSC players
Eredivisie players
Eerste Divisie players
Derde Divisie players
Nemzeti Bajnokság I players
Dutch expatriate footballers
Expatriate footballers in Hungary
Dutch expatriate sportspeople in Hungary
Association football midfielders
GVVV players
RKSV Leonidas players
Vierde Divisie players